The Business is a novel by the Scottish writer Iain Banks, published in 1999.

Plot introduction
Kate Telman is a 'level 3' executive in the Business, a vast business empire. During her sabbatical year, she comes to suspect that some of her colleagues are stealing from the organisation, and investigates.

Plot summary
The book starts with a 4:37 a.m. phone call from Mike Daniels to Kathryn (Kate) Telman. He has been drugged, and about half of his teeth randomly and expertly extracted, just before an important meeting in Japan.

The Business is a powerful (yet democratic) multinational commercial organisation, secretive (but not too sinisterly so), and very long-lived. It predates the Roman Catholic Church, and descends from a consortium of merchants in the Roman Empire which it even owned for sixty-six days (it hired a man to become emperor, but he lasted less than a month before being assassinated; a reference to the Emperor Didius Julianus). It is now considering taking over a country in order to gain a seat at the United Nations.

The story follows the heroine, Kate Telman, who is 38 and lusts after Stephen Buzetski, who is married. Starting from poverty, she has risen through the Business under the tutelage of her mentor, who adopted her at an early age, and her 'uncle Freddy', the man who invented the portable milk container (named the "chilp").

She is investigating a possible case of someone stealing from the company, starting with strange happenings at a silicon chip manufacturing plant. Although she discovers evidence of wrongdoing at a high level in the Business, she continues to believe in what they are doing as an organisation.

She travels the world, at one point being summoned by a weapon-collecting higher-up in Nebraska to talk his nephew out of writing an incendiary anti-Islamic screenplay. A scene of the book takes place on a ship on its way to be broken up at a shipyard in Sonmiani Bay. She has several telephone conversations with her therapy-damaged friend Luce in California, who provides a cynical, suspicious, foul-mouthed counterpoint to Kate's goodheartedness. She is given a DVD of Stephen's wife having extramarital sex in an attempt to influence her.

She also becomes involved in the acquisition of the small Himalayan country of Thulahn. Small and underdeveloped, bleak and vulnerable, the football pitch doubles as the airport, "the royal palace is heated by yak dung" and the "national sport is emigration". It resembles an exaggerated version of Bhutan.

Under the Business's plan, Thulahn would be utterly changed, if not destroyed, and its people thrust into the modern world. Kate is given the job of negotiating with Thulahn's Crown Prince Suvinder Dzung, who when he last met her had fallen in love with her.

Literary significance and criticism
The Business has been described as a science fiction book set in the present day.

Part of Kate's job is to keep up to date with current technological developments, and Banks mentions many contemporary gadgets. Cars in particular (Freddy has a fine collection of vintage ones), and technology in general, are celebrated and described in detail here. References to DVD technology and flying on Concorde combine to date this book to a very narrow period. (In this it is like Dead Air.) At one point, Telman tortures a Ferrari 355's engine to force a villain to confess, and she rents an Audi A3.

Kate's gradual falling in love with the place she is tasked to change beyond recognition is reminiscent of the 1983 film Local Hero.

Bibliography

The Business, Iain Banks, London : Little, Brown, 1999,  ( (paperback))

External links 
 Doing the Business, Guardian interview
 Another review

1999 British novels
Little, Brown and Company books
Novels about technology
Novels by Iain Banks
Novels set in fictional countries
Satirical novels
Scottish novels